The End of the Tour is a 1917 silent film directed by George D. Baker and starring Lionel Barrymore. It was distributed by Metro Pictures.

It is a lost film.

Cast
Lionel Barrymore – Byron Bennett
Ethel Dayton – Grace Jessup
Frank Currier – Col. Jessup
Walter Hiers – "Skinny" Smith
J. Herbert Frank – Percy Pennington
Richard Thornton – "Solly" Harris
Maud Hill – Hattie Harrison
Kate Blancke – Mrs. Ryan
Hugh Jeffrey – Lester Montague
Mary Taylor – Lottie Lee
Charles Eldridge – Seth Perkins
William Harvey – Hen Springer
Louis Wolheim
Hal Wilson

See also
Lionel Barrymore filmography

References

External links

kinotv

1917 films
American silent feature films
Films directed by George D. Baker
Lost American films
American black-and-white films
1917 drama films
1910s American films